Juan Alejandro "Orlando" Gómez Tossas (born June 24, 1946 in Juana Díaz, Puerto Rico) is a former Major League Baseball coach and scout and minor league catcher and manager.  When he served as the  pilot of the Rookie-level GCL Orioles of the Gulf Coast League; it was Gómez' 21st year as a minor league manager, his 12th straight season in the Baltimore Orioles' organization, his second tour of duty (and third season overall) as skipper of the GCL Orioles, and his 53rd consecutive year in professional baseball.

Gómez retired from baseball after the 2016 season; his 278 managerial wins set a franchise record for the Frederick Keys, Baltimore's Single A–Advanced farm system affiliate in the Carolina League. He managed Frederick for four seasons (2010–12; 2015).

Gómez is the father-in-law of former Major League player José Hernández who has also coached in the Orioles organization.

Major League coach for three clubs
Gómez spent seven years as a Major League coach for the Texas Rangers (1991–92), Tampa Bay Devil Rays (1998–2000), and Seattle Mariners (2003–04).  He was a member of the first Tampa Bay Major League squad, working under manager Larry Rothschild during the Rays' maiden 1998 season as both bullpen and third-base coach.  He also served on the MLB staffs of Bobby Valentine and Bob Melvin. As a scout for the Rangers, assigned to Latin America, Gómez was credited with signing Rubén Sierra and Juan Guzmán.

Gómez played 13 seasons (1964–76) in the minor leagues, mostly as a catcher and mostly in the organizations of the New York Yankees and Oakland Athletics. He reached the Triple-A level for 83 games over four different seasons.

In a minor league managerial career that began in 1977, Gómez also managed the Medicine Hat A's, Burlington Rangers, Tulsa Drillers, Waterbury Indians, Buffalo Bisons, Williamsport Bills, Gastonia Rangers, Everett AquaSox, Port City Roosters, Bluefield Orioles and Delmarva Shorebirds.

References

External links

 Coach's page from Retrosheet

1946 births
Living people
Birmingham A's players
Buffalo Bisons (minor league) managers
Burlington Bees players
Chattanooga Lookouts players
Fort Lauderdale Yankees players
Johnson City Yankees players
Iowa Oaks players
Leesburg A's players
Major League Baseball bullpen coaches
Major League Baseball first base coaches
Major League Baseball third base coaches
Minor league baseball managers
People from Juana Díaz, Puerto Rico
Salinas Packers players
Sarasota Yankees players
Seattle Mariners coaches
Seattle Mariners scouts
Tampa Bay Devil Rays coaches
Tampa Tarpons (1957–1987) players
Texas Rangers coaches
Texas Rangers scouts
Tucson Toros players